Svend Lauritz Gade (9 February 1877 – 25 June 1952) was a Danish theatre director, set designer, screenwriter and film director. He worked in America and Germany as well as his native country.

Selected filmography
 The Maharaja's Favourite Wife (1917)
 Hamlet (1921)
 The Secret of Brinkenhof (1923)
 Rosita (1923)
 Three Women (1924)
 Fifth Avenue Models (1925)
 Peacock Feathers (1925)
 Siege (1925)
 The Blonde Saint (1926)
 Watch Your Wife (1926)
Into Her Kingdom (1926)
 Jazz Mad (1928)
 The Masks of the Devil (1928)
 The Way Through the Night (1929)

References

Bibliography
 Langman, Larry. Destination Hollywood: The Influence of Europeans on American Filmmaking. McFarland, 2000.

External links

1877 births
1952 deaths
Danish art directors
Danish male screenwriters
Danish film directors
People from Copenhagen
20th-century screenwriters